Tallinn 2021 may refer to:

 2021 European Athletics U23 Championships
 2021 European Athletics U20 Championships